Julia Görges was the defending champion, but lost to Laura Pous Tió in the first round.

María José Martínez Sánchez won the tournament beating home player Patricia Mayr-Achleitner in the final, 6–0, 7–5.

Seeds

Qualifying

Draw

Finals

Top half

Bottom half

References
 Main Draw

Gastein Ladies - Singles
2011 Singles
Gast
Gast